Dungarpur railway station is a small railway station in Dungarpur district, Rajasthan. Its code is DNRP. It serves Dungarpur town. The station consists of a single platform. The platform is not well sheltered. It lacks many facilities including water and sanitation.

References 

Ajmer railway division
Railway stations in Dungarpur district